The Beatles: The Authorised Biography is a book written by British author Hunter Davies and published by Heinemann in the UK in September 1968. It was written with the full cooperation of the Beatles and chronicles the band's career up until early 1968, two years before their break-up. It was the only authorised biography of the Beatles written during their career. Davies published revised editions of the book in 1978, 1982, 1985, 2002 and 2009.

Background
In 1966, Hunter Davies was working as the Atticus columnist for the Sunday Times newspaper and had written two books, one of which was the novel Here We Go Round the Mulberry Bush. Moved by the Beatles' song "Eleanor Rigby", he visited Paul McCartney at the latter's house in St John's Wood, in September 1966, intending to make the song the focus of his newspaper column. At a subsequent meeting at the house, Davies hoped to persuade McCartney to write the theme song for the film adaptation of Here We Go Round the Mulberry Bush. Nothing came of this idea, but the pair began discussing the possibility of an official biography of the Beatles. Recalling their conversation in 2002, Davies said that there had been just two previous books about the band, "both paperbacks, neither substantial", and he suggested to McCartney that the publication of an official history would save the Beatles having to answer many of the usual questions put to them by the media.

Through McCartney's introduction, Davies met with Brian Epstein, the Beatles' manager. Epstein promised Davies full access to the band members and exclusivity over any other writers wishing to write a similar biography for the next two years. Signed on 25 January 1967, their contract stipulated that the Beatles had the right to make changes to the submitted manuscript. The London-based publisher Heinemann agreed an advance on the manuscript of £3000 (equivalent to £ in ), which was divided between the author and Nemperor Holdings, a company of Epstein's. Davies recalled that the advance was "nothing startling", and he was surprised at the lack of excitement about the book in the publishing industry. One of the Heinemann directors told him that "the Beatles bubble would soon burst", which was a widely held viewpoint at the time.

Writing and content
According to Davies, he spent much of the next six months researching the Beatles' story, travelling to Liverpool, Hamburg and New York. He said that information about the group's years on the club circuit in Hamburg in the early 1960s was hard to come by, and the band members were unable to remember much or agree on how many times they went to Hamburg. The lack of archived information, and the faulty memories of John Lennon and McCartney, led to Davies giving the wrong year for the pair's first meeting, which took place at a Woolton church fete in July 1957. Davies said that one of the most interesting aspects of his research was meeting the Beatles' parents, who, as a result of the band's fame since 1963, "had been uprooted from their homes, from their cultural and social roots, and didn't quite know what had happened to their sons, or themselves". He also interviewed the Beatles' school friends and teachers, as well as associates from their musical career.

Davies says that when he was with individual members of the band he wrote down their comments in his notebook, but when they were all together, he simply observed and then wrote about the occasion once he had returned home. Davies attended songwriting sessions at the Beatles' homes and some of the recording sessions for their 1967 album Sgt. Pepper's Lonely Hearts Club Band, which he recounted in detail in the book. With the Beatles' permission, he would retrieve their discarded handwritten lyric sheets at the end of the sessions. He was among the crowd of friends who joined the band for their performance of "All You Need Is Love" on the Our World satellite broadcast, on 25 June 1967, and accompanied them to the Transcendental Meditation seminar they attended in Bangor in late August. He was present also for some of the filming of Magical Mystery Tour, the project that McCartney initiated as a means to rally the band in the wake of Epstein's death during their stay in Bangor.

Davies carried out interviews at home with the band members and their wives or girlfriends, presenting a picture of normality in their domestic lives. The Beatles, particularly Lennon, were eager to downplay their artistry and influence, and Davies' narrative similarly dismisses Beatlemania as a journalistic fad. The unity among the four band members, to the partial exclusion of their romantic partners, was a message that was consistently put forward by his interviewees. He quoted McCartney as saying: "The thing is, we're all really the same person … If one of us, one side of the Mates, leans over one way we all go with him or we pull him back." When Lennon's wife, Cynthia, expressed a long-held wish to go on holiday with just her husband and their son Julian, Lennon asked, "Not even with our Beatle buddies?" – to which Cynthia replied: "They seem to need you less than you need them."

The book also includes a passage describing Lennon at home one evening, smoking marijuana with a family friend. George Harrison recounts his first experience with the hallucinogenic drug LSD, in early 1965, saying: "It was as if I'd never tasted, talked, seen, thought or heard properly before." Jane Asher, McCartney's fiancée, admitted to feeling left out of his LSD experiences but trying to accommodate his new interests, while McCartney admitted to having tried to make Asher abandon her successful career as an actress. Davies completed all the interviews for the book in January 1968.

Requested alterations
After submitting his manuscript for approval by the Beatles and their families, Davies was required to make several alterations. In Beatles aide Peter Brown's later description, this process amounted to the "wholesale censorship" of the manuscript, particularly with regard to the band's drug taking. According to Davies, however, the Beatles made relatively few demands. He says it was his own decision to leave out any mention of the band's exploits with groupies during their touring years. He says that this was out of consideration for the band members' partners, and because: "Most people over the age of 25 in the 1960s were aware of what happened between rock stars and groupies. I felt no need to go into it."

Since the Beatles had become fascinated by meditation, and at that time planned to focus on spirituality at the expense of their career, Harrison asked him to include more information on this aspect. Pattie Boyd, Harrison's wife, explains in the book: "He's found something stronger than the Beatles, though he still wants them to share it." Davies was also pressed by Lennon to present a more wholesome picture of his childhood and to cut some of the profanity – to placate Lennon's aunt and parental guardian, Mimi Smith. In addition, Epstein's family asked that some mentions of Epstein's homosexuality be cut from the manuscript, although he had approved the text in question. Davies recalled that he was careful to use the term "gay", which was "still a code word" at the time.

Publication
In Britain, Heinemann published the book on 30 September 1968. McGraw-Hill acquired the US rights for $160,000 (equivalent to $ in ), having outbid eight other major publishing houses. McGraw-Hill decided to release copies there on 17 August to avoid losing out to a rival biography by Julius Fast, titled The Beatles: The Real Story. Signet rush-released another book titled The Beatles, written by Anthony Scaduto, in an attempt to take sales from Davies' book. In the UK and the US, the cover of The Beatles: The Authorised Biography featured a composite photo of a human head made up of quadrants containing a portion of each of the Beatles' faces. Excerpts from the book appeared in The Sunday Times and in the US magazine Life.

The publication coincided with the cinema run of the Beatles' Yellow Submarine animated film and the release of "Hey Jude", the group's first single on their Apple record label. The book furthered the theme of togetherness presented by these projects. Author Jonathan Gould comments that, on this issue, the biography was already considerably out of date, given the malaise afflicting the band after their return from India, and the fact that Lennon had left Cynthia for Japanese artist Yoko Ono, just as McCartney's long-term relationship with Asher had ended. In addition, Ringo Starr had temporarily left the group in August, having grown tired of the bad atmosphere and McCartney's criticism of his drumming. In an interview he gave in early December, to Keele University's Unit arts magazine, Lennon recanted his statement that the Beatles' success was not a matter of talent or artistry, acknowledging that "It was only last year since we were talking to Hunter Davies. I've changed that much since then." Lennon also said that some of his views were "how I felt that day" when speaking to Davies, but the book was "nothing to do with what were are [now]".

The availability of the book proved beneficial to American business manager Allen Klein in his long-held quest to secure the Beatles as his clients. Before meeting with Lennon and Ono in January 1969 to discuss a solution to Apple's financial problems, Klein used the book to glean a picture of Lennon's self-image and develop an argument that convinced him to place his trust in Klein.

Revised editions
The Beatles has been revised and updated several times, starting in 1978. In the 1982 edition, Davies included a report of a telephone conversation he had with McCartney in June 1981, six months after Lennon's murder. In an outpouring that Beatles historian Erin Torkelson Weber recognises as uncharacteristically open for the singer, McCartney complained about the media's portrayal of him as inferior to Lennon, a depiction that had been enforced by the success of Philip Norman's acclaimed Beatles biography, Shout! McCartney also shared his hurt at comments made by Ringo Starr, Neil Aspinall and Cilla Black, at Starr's recent wedding, that appeared to underline others' impression of him as an insincere person. McCartney was disappointed that Davies chose to write about the conversation, which he thought was a private discussion.

The 1985 edition of the book featured a brief postscript covering more recent events. It also included further examples of what Davies described as the "strange conversations" he had with McCartney, who presented arguments that questioned the validity of his past friendship with Lennon. For the 2002 edition, published by Cassels, Davies added an introductory essay on the book's creation and more photographs. For the 40th anniversary edition, he updated the introduction to cover Harrison's death and McCartney's failed marriage to Heather Mills.

Reception
According to Davies, the authorised history was initially viewed as "quite daring and revealing", particularly in the US, and to quote the Beatles using the word "fuck" was "most unusual in a popular book at the time". Jonathan Gould considers it to be a worthy account of the band's history. He says that, aside from its few factual errors, the book deserves its status as an authoritative source for subsequent Beatles biographies.

In his December 1970 Rolling Stone interview (subsequently published as the book Lennon Remembers), John Lennon was scathing in his assessment of Davies' work, along with many aspects of what he termed the Beatles "myth". He complained that the authorised biography was part of the sanitising of the Beatles' public image, when in reality their history comprised Satyricon-like orgies on tour, heavy LSD usage by himself and Harrison, and humiliating artistic compromises throughout the Beatlemania era. Authors and biographers were subsequently divided in their view of the book's accuracy; Weber writes that, as a result of the alternative "narratives" represented by Lennon Remembers and then Shout!, both of which challenged the "Fab Four" narrative, Davies' book was "tainted by association". According to Bob Spitz, McCartney told him that the Beatles had agreed to provide the media with "a version of the facts" when they first became famous, and Davies' account was "65 percent" correct. For his part, Davies has often defended The Beatles as an accurate history, with only Mimi Smith's changes representing a serious compromise.

In his review for Rough Guides, Chris Ingham says that, due to its taming down of the band's drug use and Lennon and Epstein's personal lives, the book's "reputation suffered for a while" once more lurid accounts became available. He describes The Beatles as "full of riveting, first-hand stuff" and adds that Davies provides a "fascinating essay" in the 2002 revised edition. Writing in New Statesman in 2012, Davies said he was hurt at the time by Lennon's dismissal of the book as "bullshit", and that he was still being asked to respond to Lennon's critique over 40 years later.

Davies' official history remained the only authorised book about the Beatles' career until Harrison's 1980 autobiography, I, Me, Mine, and McCartney's authorised biography, Many Years from Now, written by Barry Miles and published in 1997. Miles, who says he regularly used The Beatles as a reference work for Many Years from Now, describes it as "censored at the time" but still "the most accurate account of their career". In 2016, Colin Fleming of Rolling Stone placed The Beatles sixth in his list of the "10 Best Beatles Books". Fleming admired the book's candour, saying: "clearly these were guys who needed to unburden themselves of some truths they'd been toting around for the bulk of a decade, and they pile up here." In a 2012 article titled "The best books on the Beatles", for The Guardian, John Harris recognised Davies' biography as one of "only two Beatles books of any quality" at the time that Lennon made his comments in Rolling Stone. Harris described it as "admirably researched and brimming with access – but stymied by his artless prose, and the constraints of being the band's in-house writer".

Notes

References

Sources

External links
 Part two of the book's serialisation in Life magazine, 20 September 1968

1968 non-fiction books
Books about the Beatles
English-language books
English non-fiction books